David Rinçon (born 8 March 1970) is a French former football forward.

References

Living people
1970 births
Association football forwards
French footballers
Paris Saint-Germain F.C. players
LB Châteauroux players
USL Dunkerque players
FC Mulhouse players
Ligue 1 players
Ligue 2 players